General der Pioniere (en: General of the engineers) was a General of the branch rank of the German Army in Nazi Germany. Until the end of World War II in 1945, this particular general officer rank was on three-star level (OF-8), equivalent to a US Lieutenant general. The rank was introduced in 1938.

The  General of the branch  ranks of the Heer were in 1945:
 General of artillery
 General of mountain troops
 General of infantry
 General of cavalry
 General of the communications troops
 General of panzer troops (armoured troops)
 General der Pioniere  / General of the engineers
 General of the medical corps
 General of the veterinary corps

The rank was equivalent to the General of the branch ranks of the Deutsche Luftwaffe (en: German Air Force):
Luftwaffe
 General of parachute troops
 General of the anti-aircraft artillery
 General of the aviators
 General of air force communications troops
 General of the air force

Other services
The rank was also equivalent to the German three-star ranks:
 Admiral of the Kriegsmarine, equivalent to (US Vice admiral) and
 SS-Obergruppenführer und General der Waffen-SS in the Waffen-SS.

List of officers who were General der Pioniere
Otto-Wilhelm Förster (1885–1966)
Erwin Jaenecke (1890–1960)
Alfred Jacob (1883–1963)
Walter Kuntze (1883–1960)
Karl Sachs (1886–1952/53) (died in Soviet gulag)
Otto Tiemann (1890–1952)

See also

General (Germany)
Comparative officer ranks of World War II

Three-star officers of Nazi Germany
Military ranks of Germany
Lists of generals